Mother Brook is a stream that flows from the Charles River in Dedham, Massachusetts, to the Neponset River in the Hyde Park section of Boston, Massachusetts.   Mother Brook was also known variously as East Brook and Mill Creek in earlier times.  Digging the brook made Boston and some surrounding communities an island, accessible only by crossing over water, making Mother Brook "Massachusetts' Panama Canal."

Dug by English settlers in 1639 to power a grist mill, it is the oldest such canal in North America. Mother Brook was important to Dedham as its only source of water power for mills, from 1639 into the early 20th century.

Today, Mother Brook is part of a flood-control system that diverts water from the Charles River to the Neponset River.  The brook's flow is under the control of the Massachusetts Department of Conservation and Recreation and is used for flood control on the Charles.  There are three remaining dams on the stream, plus a movable floodgate that controls flow from the Charles into Mother Brook.

The brook has given its name to the modern day Mother Brook Community Group, the Mother Brook Arts and Community Center, Riverside Theatre Works, and the erstwhile Mother Brook Club and Mother Brook Coalition.

Early history

Origins
Dedham, Massachusetts was first settled in 1635 and incorporated in 1636.  The settlers needed a mill for grinding corn as hand mills took too much effort.  Wind mills had been tried, but the wind was too unreliable and the North End, where a windmill was moved to in 1632, was too far away.  In 1633, the first water powered grist mill was established in Dorchester along the Neponset River at a dam he erected just about the tidal basin.  By the late 1630s, the closest watermill was in Watertown, some distance away.

Abraham Shaw who, like many other Dedhamites, came from Watertown, arrived in Dedham in 1637.  He was granted  of land as long as he erected a watermill, which he intended to build on the Charles River near the present day Needham Street bridge. Every man in the town was required to bring the millstone to Dedham from Watertown. Shaw died in 1638 before he could complete his mill, however, and his heirs were not interested in building the mill.

Although the initial settlement was adjacent to the Charles, in this vicinity it is slow-moving, with little elevation change that could provide power for a water wheel. In the spring, the Charles would occasionally flood into a swamp at Purchase Meadow between its banks and East Brook. Additionally, East Brook had an elevation change of more than 40 feet on its 3.5 mile run from near the early Dedham settlement to the Neponset River, which was sufficient to drive a water mill. However, East Brook had a low water flow insufficient to power a mill.

A year after Shaw's death the Town was still without a mill.  A committee was formed and "an audacious plan" was devised to "divert some of the plentiful water from the placid Charles into the steep but scarce East Brook. The 4,000 foot ditch was ordered to be dug at public expense by the Town on March 25, 1639, and a tax was levied on settlers to pay for it. The settlers may have been influenced by the draining of the Fens in The Wash, an area in England near many of their hometowns.

The town was so confident in this course of action that the work began before they found a new miller to replace Shaw.  There is no record of who dug it or how long it took, although Whiting family history claims it was done by Nathaniel Whiting. The labor pool would be confined to the 30 men who headed households in the town at the time, plus various servants and other male relatives. While it is unknown when exactly it was completed, there was water running through it by July 14, 1641, and has been known as Mother Brook since at least 1678. There is no record of any celebration that may have taken place upon its completion.

The work was completed amidst all the other work being done to establish a town out of the wilderness: felling trees, building homes, planting crops, clearing fields, and more.

Early mills

The Town also offered an incentive of 60 acres of land to whoever would construct and maintain a corn mill, as long as the mill was ready to grind corn by "the first of the 10th month"[i.e. December].  The first corn mill was erected in 1641 by John Elderkin, a recent arrival from Lynn, at a dam on East Brook next to the  present day Condon Park and near the intersection of Bussey St and Colburn St.  He was given a tract of land in return.  Elderkin had previously built a mill in Lynn and, in 1642, only months after opening the mill, moved out of town.  This was the first public utility in the nation.  Early settlers could grind their corn at the mill, and in return paid a tithe to help maintain the mill.  The Town relinquished rights to the brook in 1682 and placed an historical marker on the site in 1886.

In 1642, Elderkin sold half of his rights to Whiting and the other half to John Allin, Nathan Aldis, and John Dwight.  They operated the mill "in a rather stormy partnership" until 1649 when Nathaniel Whiting became the sole owner.  The Town was displeased with the "insufficient performance" of the mill under Whiting's management.  In 1652, Whiting sold his mill and all his town rights to John Dwight, Francis Chickering, Joshua Fisher, and John Morse for 250 pounds, but purchased it back the following year. Whiting and five generations of his descendants ran their mill from 1641 until 1823, when it was sold.

In January 1653 the Town offered land to Robert Crossman if he would build a mill on the Charles where Shaw had originally intended.  Crossman refused, but Whiting was so displeased by the prospect of a second mill that he offered to sell his mill back to the Town for 250 pounds.  Whiting's performance did not improve, however, and the town wanted an alternative. Daniel Pond and Ezra Morse were then given permission by the Town to erect a new corn mill on the brook above Whiting's, so long as it was completed by June 24, 1665.

Whiting was upset by the competition for both water and customers and, "never one to forgive and forget, Whiting made something of a crusade of opposition" to the new mill.  Records show that the Town spent "considerable time" trying to resolve the issue.  After meeting with the Selectmen, both agreed to live in peace and not interfere with the business of the other.  Two years later Morse was instructed to not hinder the water flow to such an extent that it would make milling difficult for Whiting.

The Town resolved that "in time of drought or want of water, the water shall in no such time be raised so high by the occasion of the new mill, that the water be thereby hindered of its free course or passage out of the Charles River to the mill.  The proprietors of the old mill are at the same time restricted from raising the water in their pond so high as to prejudice the new mill by flowage of backwater." At the same time, Whiting was also told to repair leaks in his own dam before complaining about a lack of water.

Trouble and disputes, including a lawsuit, continued between the two until 1678 when Town Meeting voted not to hear any more complaints from Whiting. In 1699, the Morse dam at present day Maverick Street was removed, and Morse was given 40 acres of land near the Neponset River at Tiot in compensation.  This seems to have been Morse's idea.  He would go on to open a new mill there, in what is today Norwood, Massachusetts, next to a sawmill that opened in 1644.

The next mill was constructed in 1682 at Saw Mill Lane.  Originally requested by Jonathan Fairbanks and James Draper, the privilege was granted to Whiting and Draper instead, likely to avoid any more problems with Whiting. He died the day the selectmen granted him the privileged, however. This mill was for fulling wool, and was the first textile mill in Dedham.  A condition was attached to this permission, however, that if the Town wanted to erect a corn mill on the brook that they may do so, unless Draper and Whiting did so at their own expense.  This mill, like the one above it, was held by the descendants of Nathaniel Whiting for 180 years.  One of Whiting's mills burned in 1700, and so the Town loaned him 20 pounds to rebuild.

At some point in the early 1700s a new leather mill was constructed by Joseph Lewis at the site of the old Morse dam.  A fourth mill was established, at present day Stone Mill Drive, just down stream from the third in 1787 by two of Whiting's descendants.  For a short period of time it produced copper cents, and then was used to manufacture paper.  A third of Whiting's descendants opened a wire factory on the same site.

Industrialization of Mother Brook

Eventually, dams and mills were constructed at five locations called "privileges" in Dedham and in what is now the Readville section of Hyde Park, which was originally part of Dedham.  Mother Brook provided water power at various times for industrial mills of several types, for the manufacture of cotton, wool, paper, wire, and carpets.  They also produced corn, fulled cloth, stamped coins, sawed lumber, cut and headed nails, manufactured paper, wove cloth, and leather. There were mills operating on Mother Brook until some time in the 20th century.  At least one mill located on Mother Brook was equipped with a steam engine as an energy source, probably to supplement the water power when the water supply was insufficient but possibly to supplant the water power entirely.  The brook may also have served for cooling the steam machinery.

The development of industry spurred the production of housing in the area for the mill workers, and churches, shops, and other businesses followed. The East Dedham Firehouse was also built to protect the area.

19th century

In the 1800s, as the region and country became more prosperous, mills began to be used for the first time to produce goods not used solely by Dedhamites and those in the immediate area. They were so profitable that by the 1820s, landowning farmers were worried about losing control of Town politics.  The growth of the industrial part of the town was so great that it was said that the factories, dye houses, dwellings, and other buildings associated with the operation of just one privilege "of themselves constitute a little village."

The mills began to attract immigrants from Europe and Canada who came to America seeking employment and a better life. The Irish came beginning with the Great Famine in the 1840s, and the Germans followed in the 1850s. Italians and other immigrants began arriving in large numbers at the end of the century. Working in harsh conditions, many only stayed for a short period of time and then moved on.

In 1870 the Merchant's Woolen Company was the largest taxpayer in town and owned two houses on High Street, five on Maverick, ten on Curve, and two "long houses" on Bussey St.  These houses were rented to employees. Several of the homes built during this time to house workers still exist as of 2020. Benjamin Bussey build a number of boarding houses, including what is today 305 and 315 High Street and 59 Maverick Street. The two buildings on High Street were originally connected by an ell. In 1829, the ten men who lived in them paid $1.50 per week and the 15 "girls" each paid $1.25.

From Mother Brook and the Neponset River out to the Boston Harbor, it was estimated that there was between $2,000,000 and $5,000,000 worth of manufacturing property along the banks in 1886.

Second privilege
The leather mill was replaced in 1807 by the Norfolk Cotton Manufactory. The local men who invested the funds for the large, wooden, spinning mill, Samuel Lowder, Jonathan Avery, Rueben Guild, Calvin Guild, Pliny Bingham, William Howe, and others, have been described as a "daring group of investors."  The mill spun imported bales of cotton, which was then put out to be woven. The fabric was then returned to the mill, finished, and shipped out.  As cotton was still new in New England, "the inhabitants felt a degree of pride in having a cotton factory in their town, and whenever their friends from the interior visited them, the first thing thought of was to mention that there was a new cotton factory in the town, and that they must go and see its curious and wonderful machinery."

It was a prosperous company, esteemed by the community, and the annual meetings of the company were marked by festivities.  From 1808 through the next decade, the company advertised for labor in the local papers as the work required more manpower than the part-time grist and saw mills that were on the brook before. The company would lend out machines to workers so they could work from home to clean and blend the raw cotton fiber.

During this time period the owners of mills downstream also complained that the Norfolk Cotton Manufactory did not provide enough water downstream for them to use. The complaints continued, despite the creation of a committee in 1811 to look into the matter.

The War of 1812 brought ruin to the company, however, when cheap imports flooded the market. The mill was purchased by Benjamin Bussey, "a man of excellent business capacity," in 1819 for a sum far below cost. Bussey also purchased a mill on the street that now bears his name from the Dedham Worsted Company only three years after they opened.  Agreement was made then on the level of the water, and was marked by drill holes in rocks along the banks still visible in 1900.

Fourth privilege
The fourth privilege was used for a variety of purposes in the 19th century, including copper cents, paper, cotton, wool, carpets, and handkerchiefs.  In the 1780s another mill, connected by the same wheel, was constructed on the site to produce wire for the new nation's nascent textile industry.   The first mill on this site burned in 1809, but was rebuilt with a new raceway and foundation.

The second mill began producing nails in 1814, and five years later its owner, Ruggles Whiting of Boston, sold it to the owner of the first mill, George Bird, who began using the whole site to manufacture paper. In 1823 it switched to cotton, using the machinery of the former Norfolk Cotton Company.  In 1835 a new stone mill was erected.  It stands today, and was converted into a condominium complex in 1986–87.  Unlike the other mills, which were constructed in a strictly utilitarian style, this factory boasted a date stone reading "1835" and a dome-roofed cupola over the mill bell.  Together they stood as a testament to the primacy of the mills in the neighborhood.

The mill at the fourth privilege, under the ownership of Bussey and with his agent, George H. Kuhn, was among the first to install water-powered broad looms. The looms enabled raw wool to enter the mills, be spun into thread, and then weaved into finished fabric, all under a single roof.

Fifth privilege
In 1814 a fifth privilege was granted in what was then Dedham, but is today the Readville neighborhood in Hyde Park.  Readville, known as early as 1655 known as the Low Plain and then Dedham Low Plain, was settled the same year the privilege was granted when the Dedham Manufacturing Company built a mill there.  James Read, one of the original proprietors, was the namesake of the neighborhood when it officially became Readville on October 8, 1847.

Conflict with Charles River mills
As Dedham became industrialized and its economic activity increasingly depended on its water power, so did other communities in the Charles River valley.  This led to conflict between the mills on Mother Brook and those using the Charles River downstream from the diversion to Mother Brook.  As early as 1767, mill owners in Newton and Watertown petitioned officials for relief from the Mother Brook diversion.  A sill was installed to determine the percentage of water diverted into Mother Brook and the percentage to remain in the Charles.

In 1895 it was said that Mother Brook was the most audacious attempt of robbery ever  recorded in the Commonwealth of Massachusetts.  It was the effort made by Dedham ... to actually steal the river Charles. ... The bold pirates built a canal from the headwaters of the Charles across to the Neponset river, and by widening and deepening this 'mother brook' they were gradually robbing their neighboring town of its beautiful waterway.

Because water diverted from the Charles River through Mother Brook increased the flow in lower sections of the Neponset River, mill owners on the Neponset joined with the Mother Brook mill owners in their defense of the diversion.  After a special act of the Great and General Court the mill owners incorporated as the Mother Brook Mill-owners Association on September 1, 1809.  Mill owners on the Charles had formed a similar corporation to advocate for themselves a few months earlier.  They argued that deviating the flow of the Charles "from its natural course" into Mother Brook violated their rights, and that as a public resource that it deserved state protection.

The Mother Brook Mill-owners Association and their counterpart on the Charles went to the Supreme Judicial Court in March 1809, and petitioned for Commissioners of Sewers to determine the proper amount of water to be diverted into Mother Brook.  The 1767 sill could not be located, and a new method was established.  The Court ruled that one quarter of the Charles could flow into Mother Brook.  The Mother Brook mill owners were not happy with this solution, and successfully petitioned the Court to stay their order limiting the amount of water flowing into the Brook.

The Sewer Commission did not present its findings to the Court for 12 years, however, at which time the Mother Brook owners objected and the report of the Commissioners was set aside.  In 1825, after another court battle, it was determined that the previous agreement was no longer viable due to the length of time taken to file the report and evidence not considered at the time.  Work on the issue resumed from 1829 to 1831, and the dispute was finally settled by an agreement among the mill owners on December 3, 1831.  This agreement established that one-third of the Charles River flow would be diverted to Mother Brook, and two-thirds would remain in the Charles for use by downstream owners.  This agreement, which was reaffirmed in 1955, "brought peace to the valley" after decades of conflict.  This agreement is still in effect as of 2017.

In 1915 it was estimated that one-third of the water of the Charles River ran through the brook, while in 1938 it was said to be one-half.  In 1993, an average of 51 million gallons per day flowed from the Charles into Mother Brook, although that flow can be altered depending on water levels further downstream.

20th century and the decline of industry

In 1900, and even 1915, after "275 years of constant usefulness," the brook made up "the source of the principal business of the town [of Dedham]."  Though the mills remained open into the 20th century, they were not immune from the larger economic forces at play.  In the late 1800s they began "losing ground in the national economic picture, inexorably sliding into an increasingly marginal sort of operation, and finally succumbing entirely to the slump which followed the First World War."  Beginning in the 1910s and 1920s they began to close as the textile industry was in decline, and by 1986 the cotton mills and brick factories that once lined the brook were "long-gone."

In the 1960s, the pond at the fifth privilege had been drained, and the land owner wanted to build a strip mall on the site.  The Department of Conservation and Recreation purchased the land instead.  They cleaned up a junkyard, dredged out silt and fill, rebuilt the dam, and published a plan to promote boating, hiking, and other outdoor activities on the site.  It also spoke about building a bathhouse, assuming the water quality improved.  When the Dedham Mall was built in the 1960s, part of the Brook was piped underground.

The sill placed at the mouth has since been replaced with a mechanical floodgate that can be raised or lowered depending on water levels in the Charles.  There is a small brick building on the site with the floodgate controls.  It was proposed in 1978 to use the three remaining dams on the bridge to generate hydroelectric power.  In 2009, the Dedham Selectmen proposed designating the brook as an historic waterway to better qualify for grants.

Pollution
During the early 1900s, the state Board of Health began enforcing pollution regulations that prevented additional manufacturing enterprises from setting up along the brook, having "resolutely set its decision against the pollution of this stream."  One plant was required to install an expensive filtration system to clean its liquid waste before dumping it in the waterway.

In 1910 the water being pumped by the Town of Hyde Park at Mother Brook was deemed unsafe for use without first boiling, and in 1911 that Town applied to be hooked up to the metropolitan water system.  By 1944 the Neponset was said to be "loaded with putrefacation."

When marshlands were reclaimed in the 1960s it was for partially for the purposes of flood control.  One of those reclaimed areas was where the Dedham Mall now stands, very near the headwaters of the brook.  The runoff from that  development, however, flowed into the brook and then the Neponset, which could not handle the extra water during heavy rains.

By the mid-20th century, "after over 300 years of industrial use, the Mother Brook was intensely polluted."  Gasoline, PCPs, and even raw sewerage had been dumped into the Brook over the years.  An oil spill of 1,300 gallons was discovered near Milton Street in 1975, and gasoline was discovered bubbling into the brook in 1990. L. E. Mason Co. was fined $250,000 by the Environmental Protection Agency for dumping trichloroethylene into the brook from 1986 to 1994.  The company was also known to dump zinc, fats, oils and greases into the waterway.

During the 1990s a science teacher at Dedham High School and her chemistry students ran water quality tests on the brook.  She found that water quality is good, though fecal coliform counts allow only partial body contact.  While great progress has been made, in 2017 Mother Brook remained one of the most polluted tributaries to the Neponset River.  Unlike most waterways in the Neponset watershed, Mother Brook is less polluted during heavy rains than during drier times, due to the abundance of clean Charles River water flowing into it.

Cleanups and maintenance
After centuries of industrialization and dumping, Mother Brook became quite polluted.  Cleanups have been organized by a number of groups in recent decades.

In 2007, the brook was redirected under Hyde Park Avenue by the Commonwealth of Massachusetts to clean up the PCBs that had previously been dumped into the water. That cleanup led to a federal lawsuit over who would pay for the cost of the remediation. Ten years later, in 2017, the Department of Conservation and Recreation unveiled plans to remove several trees and overgrown vegetation close to the diversion point at the Charles River in order to stabilize and protect the dam controlling the flow of water from the river into the brook.

National Register of Historic Places
In the 2010s, the Mother Brook Community Group, the East Dedham neighborhood association, began a campaign to get Mother Brook listed on the National Register of Historic Places. The results of the first phase of the effort, an architectural study of the Brook and adjourning areas, was completed by Heritage Consultants and presented in January 2020. The consultants discovered over 70 buildings, areas, and structures still standing that relate in some way to the history of the mills. They include

202 Bussey St. which was originally built circa 1855 as the Merchant Woolen Company's Factory Mill Number 2. It originally housed a carpenter's shop with spinning machines on the upper floors.
Two private homes on Maverick and High Streets that were built as boarding houses for workers of the Maverick Woolen companies circa 1825. Room and board at these establishments cost $1.50 a week for men and $1.25 in 1829 when there were ten men and 15 women living there.
Brookdale Cemetery, which was built to accommodate a swelling population that moved to town to work in the mills.

The consultant's research was submitted to the Massachusetts Historical Commission who will determine whether Mother Book qualifies for the National Register listing.

Accidents and floods

Floods
In 1886, waters flooded their banks and put the dams, and the one at Merchant's Mill especially, in danger of breaching.  There were fears that a dam in Dover would give way, and the resulting rush of water would destroy the Dedham dam.  Prior to this Merchant's Mill was considered impregnable.   It was one of the greatest floods Dedham Center had ever seen.

Streets in the Manor section of Dedham had water two to three feet deep when the brook flooded in March 1936.  Rain and melting snow caused the Charles and Mother Brook to flood their banks in 1948, putting some parts of Dedham under water.

Ice chunks at two of the dams caused flooding in 1955.  Firefighters sprayed high pressure water at the ice jam off Milton Street, and a crane scooped out debris from the dam and broke the ice at Maverick Street.  The water level dropped two feet that day as a result.

Later that year, during the worst floods in New England's history, 150 people in Hyde Park had to evacuate their homes after flood waters from Mother Brook and the Neponset River collapsed preventative embankments.  Mayor John Hynes led an inspection party to survey the damage.  Roads, including the V.F.W. Parkway, were flooded in Dedham.  That fall the state approved $2 million for flood control in Mother Brook and the Neponset.  Another $2 million was approved by the Massachusetts House of Representatives in 1960.

A team of 120 men descended on Hyde Park at the junction of the Neponset and Mother Brook with 1,200 sandbags to prevent flooding in March 1958.  The water was already threatening homes and roads in January of that year.  At least "a couple hundred" residents along the Charles, Neponset, and Mother Brook had to be evacuated when those rivers flooded in 1968.  The worst area in town was along Bussey St, along the brook.

1938 flood
In 1938, while much of the Charles and Neponset Rivers were flooding their banks and causing $3,000,000 in damage, the area around Mother Brook was unharmed in the early days of the surge.  Dams along the brook controlled the heavy flow of water which were said to be 15,000 cubic feet per second.  It was close to the level of the 1936 flood, but six inches below the flood of 1920.

Scores of homes in low-lying areas eventually had their basements flooded, and the wooden bridge at Maverick Street was threatened.  Sandbags, an oil truck, and granite slabs were placed on the bridge to keep it from washing away.  The Boston Envelope Company, located next to the bridge, had their first floor flooded.

Three young men who tried to canoe down the Charles during the 1938 flood were overturned in a whirlpool and were swept down the swollen Mother Brook. They were saved after an East Street rescuer ran 500 yards and tossed them a garden hose.

Drownings and rescues
Over the years there have been a number of accidents on the brook, including some resulting who drowned.  In December 1905, a 12-year-old boy named James Harnett drowned while skating across ice only half an inch thick on Mill Pond.  His brother William, 17, rushed to save him, but both ended up in the water.  The older brother was saved by a human chain of other skaters, while the younger boy's body was recovered by police an hour later.

An 8-year-old boy fell through the ice and was under water for 20 minutes in 1980.  A passing motorist and three others dove in the brook, but were not able to locate him.  A WHDH radio traffic helicopter broke the ice with its pontoons, allowing Boston firefighters to spot and recover David Tundidor's body.  He was in a medically induced coma, but died four days later.

Others have been more fortunate, and were able to be rescued.  After sneaking out of the house in July 1899, 13-year-old William Dennen dove off a bridge near his house on Emmett Ave to save the life of 7-year-old Mary Bouchard, who had fallen in.  John F. McGraw, a 33-year-old Scottish immigrant, attempted suicide by drowning in the brook in 1916.  After going over a dam and landing in shallow water, the father of three climbed onto shore and was taken to the psychiatric hospital for evaluation.  Paul Flanagan, 23, survived for 3.5 hours in the water after his car plunged into the brook in February 1983.  He was brought to Norwood Hospital with hypothermia and was later released.

Two boys claimed to have found a human leg in the brook in 1937, but police could not find either the leg or the body.

Other events
In April 1878, a "balky horse" sent six people into the brook, but none were injured.  A similar incident occurred in 1837 when a thirsty horse brought himself, the teamster driving him, and the load of paper he was carrying from the mills in Dedham to Braintree into the brook.

Moments after leaving Dedham Square for Forest Hills in 1911, a streetcar jumped the track on Washington Street and dangled 35 passengers over the brook.  Only two minor injuries were reported.  A cat was saved from a flooded culvert in 1938 by a team of neighborhood boys after the Dedham Fire Department was unable to do so.  A 13-year-old boy, William Sullivan, was kneeling on a raft in 1956 behind Brookdale Cemetery when his friend accidentally shot him in the leg with a .32 caliber gun.

Mills

First privilege
The first privilege was located next to present day Condon Park, corner of Bussey St and Colburn St.

Second privilege

The second privilege was located at present day Maverick Street.

Third privilege

The third privilege was located at present day Saw Mill Lane.

Fourth privilege

The fourth privilege's first mill was located at present day Stone Mill Drive.

The fourth privilege's second mill was located at present day Stone Mill Drive.

Fifth privilege

The fifth privilege was located at the corner of Knight St. and River St. in Readville.

Bridges
Today, after diverting from the Charles, Mother Brook immediately runs under a bridge on Providence Highway. When it was constructed, a tablet was erected on the bridge commemorating the brook.  Shortly thereafter it runs under a culvert at the Dedham Mall before appearing again at the transfer station and running to the Washington Street Bridge.  It then crosses under Maverick Street, Bussey Street, and Saw Mill Lane, sites of three old mills.  Within the Mother Brook Condominium complex, just downstream from Centennial Dam, the brook runs under a small bridge that connects North Stone Mill Drive and South Stone Mill Drive. After entering Hyde Park, it runs under bridges at River Street and Reservation Road, before merging with the Neponset.

Various improvements to the bridges have been proposed and carried out over the years by the Commonwealth of Massachusetts, the Town of Dedham, the City of Boston, and private interests.

Recreation

A canoeist in 1893 wrote of his trip down the brook that upon entering from the Charles he

bid adieu to the flat marshlands and broad views of the farther river, for the little brook caries us thought varied scenery now by a barnyard with it lowing cattle, ducks splashing and dibbing in the water and a dilapidated old carryall backed into the stream, left to wash itself, and then into the cool woodlands, where we can almost touch the banks on either hand.  And the green alder bushes arch over our heads, forming a cool and shady tunnel. 
<p>
The water is so shallow that we see plainly the brilliantly colored pebbles on the bottom and daintly hued little fish  darting hither and thither.  it is a busy, brawling stream and hurries on to join the Neponset, industrioulsy turning the numerous mills on the way.

The Brook was long a popular place to swim and ice skate.  A public bath house was constructed in 1898 at a cost of $700.  In 1907, afternoons on Tuesdays and Fridays were set aside for women's use.  Girls 16 and under were allowed in free, while those older were charged 5 cents.  The youngest member of the Parks Commission, J. Vincent Reilly, taught crowds of more than 200 how to swim.  It burned down in 1923, and a proposal in 1924 to rebuild it was expected to receive an unfavorable recommendation from the Warrant Committee.  The swimming area at present day Mill Pond Park was considered a perk of working at the Boston Envelope Company in 1936.  According to one contemporary, in the winters of the 1870s and 1880s the "youth then gathered on the ice [to ice skate] must have numbered in the hundreds."

Future Supreme Court justice Louis D. Brandeis wrote to William Beltran De Las Casas, the Chairman of the Metropolitan Park Commission, in 1905, asking him to consider including the brook in the Metropolitan Park System of Greater Boston.  He said "unique in the metropolitan district.  It is quite like the Main woods."  He added that if it was added, though it is separated from the rest of the parks, "the future interests of our metropolitan park system would in my opinion be greatly subserved."  De Las Cas agreed with Brandeis, but the mill owners in the area threatened to sue to prevent the action, and the costs of taking it by eminent domain were high.

In 1915 it was said that well-kept gardens could be seen along both sides of the length of the brook.  It was also a popular boating and bathing destination.  In at least the 1930s and 1940s, the state Division of Fish and Game stocked the brook with trout for fishing. The banks were lined with fishermen during parts of 1941.

While Dedham had a Commissioner of Mother Brook during this time period, the Planning Board was responsible for the recreation aspects of the brook, appointing a special police officer and life-saver, and running swimming and diving competitions.  The swimming competitions drew crowds of 800.

In 1968 the Metropolitan Park Commission applied for an "Open Spaces Grant" from the federal government, during which time part of the area near the headwaters were being drained to build the Dedham Mall.  The Boston Natural Areas Fund conserved a lot along the brook in 1980 as "green relief from massed buildings and pavement."  The City of Boston built a new park on Reservation Road in 1999, shoring up the banks of the brook while they worked.  The project on the six acre site included a skateboard park, a landscaped nature area along the brook, and a cleanup of contaminants.

Today along the banks of the brook are walking trails, a picnic area, a canoe launch, Condon Park, a handicapped accessible playground, and more.  The Mother Brook Community Group won a grant from Dedham Savings to turn the old Town Beach at the intersection of Bussey and Colburn Street into a passive park with an observation deck, benches, landscaping and a stone path.  Mill Pond Park opened on July 12, 2014.  The Community Group has also opened more areas of the brook back up to fishing, and the catches are safe to eat in moderate amounts.  At the 2015 Fall Annual Town Meeting, the Town established the Mother Brook 375th Anniversary Committee.  Serving on it were Dan Hart, Nicole Keane, Brian Keaney, Vicky L. Krukeberg, Charlie Krueger, Gerri Roberts, and Jean Ford Webb.

Notes

References

Works cited

Further reading

 "Men of Useful Trades, Craftsmen and Mills of the Dedham Grant, 1636-1840," by Electa Kane Tritsch, Dedham Grant Survey Project, 1981

Parks in Dedham, Massachusetts
Charles River
Neponset River
Watersheds of Boston Harbor
Rivers of Norfolk County, Massachusetts
Rivers of Massachusetts
Canals in Massachusetts
Canals opened in 1639
1639 establishments in Massachusetts
Articles containing video clips
Transportation buildings and structures in Norfolk County, Massachusetts